San Luca may refer to:
 San Luca, a comune in the Province of Reggio Calabria in the Italian region Calabria, Italy
 San Luca feud, a long-running conflict between two clans of the 'Ndrangheta
 San Luca, Venice, a church in the sestiere of San Marco in Venice, Italy 
 Accademia di San Luca

See also 

 Luca (disambiguation)
 San Lucas (disambiguation)